Isabel Plach (born 19 April 1987 in Vienna) is an Austrian handballer who plays for Hypo Niederösterreich and the Austrian national team.

Achievements
Women Handball Austria:
Winner: 2006, 2007, 2008, 2009, 2010, 2011
ÖHB Cup:
Winner: 2006, 2007, 2008, 2009, 2010, 2011
EHF Champions League:
Finalist: 2008

References

1987 births
Living people
Handball players from Vienna
Austrian female handball players